Andrei Viktorovich Pocheptsov (born 1 June 1968) is a Russian professional football coach and a former player. He is a coach with the academy of FC Zenit Saint Petersburg.

Club career
He made his professional debut in the Soviet Second League B in 1990 for FC Dynamo Leningrad.

He played for FC Zenit Leningrad in the Soviet Cup and USSR Federation Cup.

References

1968 births
Footballers from Saint Petersburg
Living people
Soviet footballers
Russian footballers
Association football defenders
FC Zenit Saint Petersburg players
FC Dynamo Saint Petersburg players
FC Zhemchuzhina Sochi players
Russian Premier League players
Russian football managers
FC Sheksna Cherepovets players